David Felipe Cabrera (born January 10, 1995) is a Colombian footballer.

Career

College
Cabrera played four years of college soccer at South Dakota School of Mines and Technology between 2013 and 2016.

Professional
Cabrera signed for United Soccer League side Rio Grande Valley FC Toros during their 2018 season. He made his professional debut on August 26, 2018, start in a 2-0 victory over Orange County SC.

Personal
David is the son of Wilmer Cabrera, currently the head coach of Major League Soccer side Houston Dynamo. His brother, Wilmer Jr., is also a footballer.

References

External links
 

1995 births
Living people
Colombian footballers
Colombian expatriate footballers
South Dakota Mines Hardrockers men's soccer players
Rio Grande Valley FC Toros players
Association football midfielders
Expatriate soccer players in the United States
USL Championship players
Soccer players from Colorado
Footballers from Cali